Hans Johannes Höfer was born in Stuttgart, Germany. An artist, he wrote a significant travel guide to Bali, and eventually produced a whole series of travel guide books.

In the late 1960s he trekked from Europe to Asia. He was especially intrigued by Bali, where he earned a living by selling his paintings of the Indonesian island to tourists. He was frustrated, however, by the lack of easily available information on Bali's colourful culture and people. Where did their beliefs originate? How did their art develop? Hoefer searched for a guidebook that would provide this information, as well as describe its tourist sites. It would give an insight into the people's values and politics; it would use strong visual images to communicate directly the atmosphere of the destination and the everyday life of its inhabitants; and it would encourage readers to celebrate the essence of the place rather than fashion it to suit their preconceptions. He couldn't find such a book, so he decided to create it. With the financial backing of a local hotel, he published Insight Guide: Bali in 1970.

He sold his share of the Insight Guide company to Langenscheidt KG, and currently owns Apa Villa, Sri Lanka, one of the top rated get-away hotels. He also owns an 80-foot schooner called Rising Tide. He is married to a retired journalist/reporter Cynthia Hoefer, and has two children, Hans-sen Hoefer and Hanli Hoefer.

References

German travel writers
Living people
German male non-fiction writers
Year of birth missing (living people)